Neoclytus personatus is a species of beetle in the family Cerambycidae. It was described by Chemsak and Linsley in 1974.

References

Neoclytus
Beetles described in 1974